Mood Kayō: Utahime Shōwa Meikyoku Shū (ムード歌謡 〜歌姫昭和名曲集) is a cover album by Japanese singer Akina Nakamori. It was released on 24 June 2009 by Universal Music Japan. It is Nakamori's sixth cover album.

The album was released in limited and regular editions. The regular edition includes four minutes of footage of the recording of the three album songs.

The album consists of the Modo Kayoukyoku songs, which were released in Japan during 1960s and 1970s.

Chart performance
Mood Kayō: Utahime Shōwa Meikyoku Shū debuted at number 30 on the Oricon Album Weekly Chart, charted for 3 weeks and sold over 6,400 copies.

Track listing

References

2009 albums
Japanese-language albums
Akina Nakamori albums
Universal Music Japan albums